Dirtseller Mountain is a summit in the U.S. states of Alabama and Georgia.

The mountain's English name is an accurate preservation of its native Cherokee-language name.

References

Landforms of Cherokee County, Alabama
Mountains of Alabama
Mountains of Chattooga County, Georgia
Mountains of Georgia (U.S. state)